is a village located in Yamagata Prefecture, Japan. ,  the village had an estimated population of 4132 in 1347 households, and a population density of 34 persons per km².

Geography
Sakegawa is located in northern Yamagata Prefecture, bordered to the west by the Dewa Mountains. The area is known for its heavy snowfalls in winter.

Neighboring municipalities
Yamagata Prefecture
Sakata
Shinjō
Mamurogawa
Tozawa

Climate
Sakegawa has a Humid continental climate (Köppen climate classification Cfa) with large seasonal temperature differences, with warm to hot (and often humid) summers and cold (sometimes severely cold) winters. Precipitation is significant throughout the year, but is heaviest from August to October. The average annual temperature in Sakegawa is 10.6 °C. The average annual rainfall is 1902 mm with September as the wettest month. The temperatures are highest on average in August, at around 24.2 °C, and lowest in January, at around -1.7 °C.

Demographics
Per Japanese census data, the population of Sakegawa has declined by more than half from its peak around 1950.

History
The area of present-day was Sakegawa part of ancient Dewa Province. After the start of the Meiji period, the area became part of Mogami District, Yamagata Prefecture. The village of Sakegawa was established on December 1, 1954 by the merger of the villages of Toyota and Toyosato, both from Mogami District.

Economy
The economy of Sakegawa is based on agriculture. The town is famous for nameko mushrooms, of which it produces a substantial percentage for Yamagata Prefecture. The town's other main exports are rice and flowers, such as roses and gentians. Sakegawa is also well known for fishing, with the Salmon Festival (鮭祭り) being held at Eco Park every October.

Education
Sakegawa has one public elementary school and one public middle school operated by the village government.

Transportation

Railway
 East Japan Railway Company -  Ōu Main Line

Highway

Sister city relations
 - Kawit, Cavite, Philippines

Local attractions

Kabuki
Public kabuki theater performances are given on the first Sunday of July every year.

Salmon Festival
Held on the last Sunday of October every year. During this festival people pay a set price to attempt to catch salmon out of the river with their bare hands.

Niwazuki Kannon Lantern Festival
Held in August. Floating lanterns are sent down the river beginning at the Niwazuki Buddhist temple.

Notes

External links

Official Website 

 
Villages in Yamagata Prefecture